Damage is any change to a thing that degrades it from its original state.

Damage may also refer to:

General concepts
 Collateral damage, unintended damage caused during a military operation
 Fire damage
 Foreign object damage, damage to a vehicle or system caused by any foreign substance, debris, or article
 Hydrogen damage, metal degradation processes due to interaction with hydrogen
 Property damage, damage to public or private property
 Radiation damage, damage or injury due to ionizing radiation
 Water damage, damage done by water to materials not resistant to the effect of water
 Damage mechanics, damage to materials due to cyclic mechanical loads
 Biology and medical:
 Any form of injury
 Articular cartilage damage
 Brain damage
 Cell damage, to a biological cell
 Nerve damage
 Somatic damage (disambiguation)

Law
 Damages, a sum of money awarded by a court of law
 Institutional damage, unintended consequences to an individual resulting from interaction with an institution

Entertainment

Film and television
 Damage (1992 film), a film by Louis Malle
 Damage (2009 film), a film by Jeff King, starring Stone Cold Steve Austin
 Damage (2016 film), a film by Dhikusooka Denis Jr.
 "Damage" (Angel), a 2004 episode of Angel
 "Damage" (Star Trek: Enterprise), a 2004 episode of Star Trek: Enterprise
 "Damage" (Supergirl), a 2017 episode of Supergirl

Gaming
 The general loss of a character or enemy's health, caused by an attack or injury
 Damage Incorporated, a 1998 computer game for Mac and Windows by Paranoid Productions
 Damage over time, a game design concept
 Quad damage, a power-up in the first-person shooter computer game series Quake
 Splash damage, damage taken by players or objects in the area surrounding a point of weapon impact
 Splash Damage, British computer game developer

Literature
 Damage (DC Comics), a comic book character from DC Comics
 Damage (Marvel Comics), a comic book character from Marvel Comics
 Damage (Hart novel), a 1991 novel by Josephine Hart
 Damage (Jenkins novel), a 2001 young adult novel by A. M. Jenkins
 Damage, a fictional card game in the 1987 Iain M. Banks novel Consider Phlebas

Music
 Damage (British group), an R&B boy band
 Damage (American band), a 1980s New York hardcore band
 DJ Damage, Australian hip hop DJ and turntablist

Albums 
 Damage (Blues Explosion album) or the title song, 2004
 Damage (Jimmy Eat World album) or the title song (see below), 2013
 Damage (Kosheen album) or the title song, 2007
 Damage: Live or the title song, by David Sylvian and Robert Fripp, 1994/2001
 The Damage, by Ludus, 2002

Songs 
 "Damage" (H.E.R. song), 2020
 "Damage" (Jimmy Eat World song), 2013
 "Damage" (Mýa song), 2018
 "Damage" (Pharoahe Monch song), 2012
 "Damage" (You Am I song), 2000
 "The Damage" (song), by Marillion, 2004
 "Damage", by Chris Brown from Exclusive, 2007
 "Damage", by the Cooper Temple Clause from Make This Your Own, 2007
 "Damage", by Exo from Don't Mess Up My Tempo, 2018
 "Damage", by Fit for Rivals, 2009
 "Damage", by Myka Relocate from The Young Souls, 2015
 "Damage", by Namie Amuro, 2012
 "Damage", by PartyNextDoor from Seven Days, 2017
 "Damage", by Tiefschwarz, 2006
 "Damage", by Yo La Tengo from I Can Hear the Heart Beating as One, 1997

See also
 
 
 Damages (disambiguation)
 Damaged (disambiguation)
 Damage Control (disambiguation)
 Damage Done (disambiguation)
 Damageplan, American heavy metal band
 Damaging quotation, a short utterance by a public figure used by opponents as a discrediting tactic
 Break (disambiguation)
 Corrosion
 Degradation (disambiguation)
 Destroy (disambiguation)
 Dam (disambiguation)